The south-eastern Transylvania region in Romania currently has one of the highest numbers of existing fortified churches from the 13th to 16th centuries. It has more than 150 well preserved fortified churches of a great variety of architectural styles (out of an original 300 fortified churches).

Listed as a UNESCO World Heritage Site, Villages with Fortified Churches in Transylvania are seven villages (six Saxon and one Székely) founded by the Transylvanian Saxons. They are dominated by fortified churches and characterized by a specific settlement pattern that has been preserved since the Late Middle Ages.

The list

The seven villages listed as a UNESCO World Heritage Site:

History
The Saxon villages of Transylvania appeared in the twelfth century when the Kings of Hungary settled German colonists in the area. They had a special status among nations in the province and their civilisation managed to survive and thrive, forming a very strong community of farmers, artisans and merchants. Being situated in a region constantly under the threat of the Ottoman and Tatar invasions, they built fortifications of different sizes. The most important towns were fully fortified, and the smaller communities created fortifications  centered on the church, where they added defensive towers and storehouses to keep their most valuable goods and to help them withstand long sieges.

Description

The topography in Southern Transylvania is that of a plateau, cut by wide valleys of various small rivers that flow into larger ones, namely the Olt River, Mureș River, Târnava Mare River and Târnava Mică River. The villages follow the topography closely and try to make the best of it; thus villages situated in a valley developed around a central street and possibly some secondary ones, while those situated on a flatter spot follow a looser, radial pattern. Due to security reasons and the traditions of the Saxon inhabitants, the villages are compact.

The main element is the church, always situated in the middle of the town. Different types of fortifications can be found: a small enceinte around the church, a row of fortifications around the church or a real fortress with multiple fortification walls centered on the church. The churches have been adapted to include defensive functions; all of them are either Romanesque basilicas or single-nave churches of the late Gothic period. The churches often include many additions, ranging in age from the original period in which the churches were built Late Middle Ages to the sixteenth century. Many churches also include baroque elements from that period, as the baroque style was very popular in the region.

In almost all cases, the church is situated in an easily defendable position, generally on a hilltop. Elements of fortifications found in the main cities in the area have been adapted here, and they are a testimony of the building techniques used along the years by the Saxon community. Some fortifications had observation towers, some of them being church towers adapted to the needs of a fortress. The materials are the traditional ones, stone and red bricks, with a red clay tiled roof, a typical feature of the area.

Close to the church there is the main square of the village or Tanzplaz (Dance Square) to which social life gravitated. The only buildings situated next to the fortifications are those of communal use: the school or the village hall. The parish house, along with the houses of the most wealthy villagers, were situated around this square. Also in most sites, barns for grain storage are situated close to the centre of the village.

See also
 List of World Heritage Sites in Romania
Fortified Churches Foundation
 List of castles in Romania
 Tourism in Romania

References

External links

Description on the UNESCO's site
Fortified Churches Foundation
The list of Transylvanian villages with fortified churches on the site of the Institute for Cultural Memory
Saxon fortified churches and citadels from Transylvania
Mihai Eminescu Trust
Complete list of the German villages in Transylvania 
Description of the sites on worldheritagesite.org
Saxon fortified churches in Transylvania
Fortified churches in Transylvania
Video Fortified churches in Transylvania 

 
13th-century establishments in Europe
Fortifications in Romania
 
Medieval Transylvania
Buildings and structures in Transylvania
Tourist attractions in Romania
World Heritage Sites in Romania